A general election was held in the U.S. state of New Mexico on November 6, 2018. All of New Mexico's executive officers were up for election as well as a United States Senate seat, and all of New Mexico's three seats in the United States House of Representatives.

Governor

Incumbent Republican Governor Susana Martinez was term-limited and could not run for election to a third consecutive term.

Results

Attorney General

Incumbent Democratic Attorney General Hector Balderas ran for re-election to a second term.

Democratic primary

Candidates

Declared
Hector Balderas, incumbent Attorney General of New Mexico

Results

Republican primary

Candidates

Declared
Michael Hendricks, immigration attorney

Results

Libertarian primary

Candidates

Declared
A. Blair Dunn, attorney and son of Public Lands Commissioner Aubrey Dunn Jr.

Results

General election

Polling

Results

Secretary of State

Incumbent Democratic Secretary of State Maggie Toulouse Oliver, who was elected in the 2016 special election, ran for re-election to a full term in 2018.

For the general election, Governing magazine projected the race as "leans Democratic".

Democratic primary

Candidates

Declared
Maggie Toulouse Oliver, incumbent Secretary of State

Results

Republican primary
After winning the primary, Cox decided to withdraw from the race. As a result, the New Mexico Republican Party chose Gavin Clarkson as their nominee.

Candidates

Nominee
 Gavin Clarkson, former professor at New Mexico State University and former deputy assistant secretary of the U.S. Department of Interior

Withdrew
JoHanna Cox, attorney

Results

Libertarian primary
Jeff was replaced as the Libertarian nominee by Ginger Grider after withdrawing from the race.

Candidates

Nominee
 Ginger Grider, medical cannabis advocate

Withdrew
Sandra Jeff, former Democratic state representative (2009–2015)

Results

General election

Predictions

Polling

Results

Treasurer

Incumbent Democratic State Treasurer Tim Eichenberg ran for re-election to a second term.

Democratic primary

Candidates

Declared
Tim Eichenberg, incumbent State Treasurer

Results

Republican primary

Candidates

Declared
Arthur L. Castillo, former CFO for the New Mexico State Treasurer's Office

Results

General election

Polling

Results

State Auditor

After incumbent Democratic State Auditor Tim Keller was elected Mayor of Albuquerque in the 2017 mayoral election, and resigned to take office, Governor Martinez appointed Bernalillo County Commissioner Wayne Johnson (R) to be the new State Auditor.

Republican primary

Candidates

Declared
Wayne A. Johnson, incumbent State Auditor

Results

Democratic primary

Candidates

Declared
Brian Colón, chair of the New Mexico Democratic Party
Bill McCamley, state representative State representative

Results

General election

Polling

Results

Commissioner of Public Lands

Incumbent Libertarian Commissioner of Public Lands Aubrey Dunn Jr. is not running for re-election to a second term in office.

Democratic primary

Candidates

Declared
Stephanie Garcia Richard, state representative
 George Muñoz, state senator
 Garrett VeneKlasen, executive director of the New Mexico Wildlife Federation

Results

Republican primary

Candidates

Declared
Pat Lyons, New Mexico Public Regulation Commissioner for the 2nd district and former New Mexico Commissioner of Public Lands (2003–2011)

Results

Libertarian primary

Candidates

Declared
Michael Lucero, rancher

Results

General election

Polling

Results

Public Regulation Commission
Three of the five seats on the New Mexico Public Regulation Commission will be up for election.

District 2 Republican incumbent Pat Lyons did not run for re-election in order to run for Commissioner of Public Lands.

District 4 Democratic incumbent Lynda Lovejoy and District 5 Democratic incumbent Sandy R. Jones were eligible to run for re-election.

Public Education Commission 
Five of the ten seats on the New Mexico Public Education Commission were up for election.

District 2 incumbent Republican Millie Pogna, District 3 incumbent Democrat Carmie Lynn Toulouse, District 5 incumbent Democrat James F. Conyers, District 6 incumbent Democrat Gilbert Peralta, and District 7 incumbent Democrat Patricia Gipson were eligible to run for re-election.

Supreme Court
Gary L. Clingman, appointed by Governor Susana Martinez was eligible to run for a full term.

General election

Results

Court of Appeals

New Mexico House of Representatives

In 2018, all 70 seats in the New Mexico House of Representatives were up for election in 2018. Democrats have a majority in the chamber heading into the election. On election day 2018, Democrats hold 38 seats and Republicans hold 32 seats. To re-claim control, Republicans needed to net 4 seats from Democrats.

Democrats increased their majority by flipping 9 seats from Republican control. Following the 2018 election, Democrats held a 47 to 23 seat advantage over Republicans.

New Mexico State Senate
The New Mexico State Senate only holds regularly-scheduled elections every four years; therefore, no State Senate seats are up for election in 2018, but all 42 will be in 2020.

United States Senate

Incumbent Democratic Senator Martin Heinrich was re-elected to a second term.

United States House of Representatives

All of New Mexico's three seats in the United States House of Representatives were up for election in 2018. Democrats maintained District 1 and District 3 as well as flipped District 2 from Republicans. This means that there were no Republicans representing New Mexico in the federal government following the 2018 election.

District 1

District 2

District 3

Notes

Partisan clients

References

External links
Candidates at Vote Smart
Candidates at Ballotpedia
Campaign finance at OpenSecrets

Official Attorney General campaign websites
Hector Balderas (D) for Attorney General
A. Blair Dunn (L) for Attorney General
Michael Hendricks (R) for Attorney General

Official Secretary of State campaign websites
Gavin Clarkson (R) for Secretary of State
Ginger Grider (L) for Secretary of State
Maggie Toulouse Oliver (D) for Secretary of State

Official State Treasurer campaign websites
Arthur L. Castillo (R) for Treasurer
Tim Eichenberg (D) for Treasurer

Official State Auditor campaign websites
Brian Colón (D) for Auditor
Wayne Johnson (R) for Auditor

Official Commissioner of Public Lands campaign websites
Patrick H. Lyons (R) for Public Lands Commissioner
Stephanie Garcia Richard (D) for Public Lands Commissioner

Official Public Regulation Commission district 2 campaign websites
Jeff Byrd (R) for Public Regulation Commissioner
Kevin Sanders (D) for Public Regulation Commissioner

Official Public Regulation Commission district 5 campaign websites
Steve Fischmann (D) for Public Regulation Commissioner
Ben Hall (R) for Public Regulation Commissioner

 
New Mexico